Quiz Show (onscreen title: "The Kee Games Quiz Show") is a two-player arcade game by Kee Games, a company originally established by Atari, Inc. The game was originally released in 1976. A computerized version of a quiz show, the game presents multiple choice answers to questions from a range of categories.

Gameplay
The game asks the player questions, with the player pressing the corresponding button to answer. Questions are multiple choice, chosen from a pool of 1000 questions in four categories: people, sports, movie, and potpourri. Categories are chosen prior to the game's start. Points are awarded for a correct answer, with point deductions for incorrect answers. Bonus points are also awarded, and are based on the length of time it takes to answer the question. At the end of game play, the player is given a rating of Dunce, Lucky, Smart, or Genius based on their score.

Technology
The game is housed in a custom cabinet that includes two sets (one set per player) of four buttons  on each side of the monitor. The game PCB uses a Signetics 2650 CPU, with all questions and answers stored on a removable 8-track audio cassette tape that is streamed to the game.

Quiz Show is believed to be the first game to utilize the now well-known "arcade font". The 8×8 monospaced typeface was later used in Sprint 2, as well as in many arcade games by other manufacturers.

References

Arcade video games
Arcade-only video games
Quiz video games
1976 video games
Atari arcade games
Video games developed in the United States